Whiskey Myers is an American Southern rock/country group from Palestine, Texas composed of Cody Cannon (lead vocals and acoustic guitar), John Jeffers (lead guitar, slide guitar, lap steel guitar, vocals), Cody Tate (lead and rhythm guitar, vocals), Jeff Hogg (drums), Tony Kent (percussion/drums), and Jamey Gleaves (bass). They have released six albums, the latest being Tornillo released in July 2022.

Music career
In 2008, the band released their debut album, Road of Life. Their second album, Firewater, was released by Wiggy Thump in 2011 and debuted in the Top 30 on the Billboard Top Country Albums chart, largely thanks to the single "Ballad of a Southern Man". On February 4, 2014, the album, Early Morning Shakes, was released and received mostly positive reviews. In September 2016, their fourth album Mud was released. The band's self-titled album was released on September 27, 2019 followed by "Tornillo" in July 29, 2022.

The band started when friends Cody Cannon and John Jeffers began learning guitar together, inspired by the music of Lynyrd Skynyrd, Hank Williams Jr., Waylon Jennings, amongst many other artists. After being joined by Cannon's co-worker and friend Cody Tate, they began calling themselves Lucky Southern. After playing together for a while, the three decided to start a more serious band. They enlisted friend Jeff Hogg to play drums, and asked Cannon's cousin Gary Brown to play bass (although he did not know how to play the instrument at the time). They began playing shows around their hometown and native state of Texas, slowly starting to build a following on the Texas/Red Dirt scene.

In 2018, the band was featured in four episodes of the Kevin Costner Paramount Network series Yellowstone. Shortly afterwards, the band's three available albums moved into the top 10 iTunes country chart. Their most recent album at the time, Mud, reached No. 1 on the charts, and its song "Stone" reached No. 9 in all genres. 

On September 27, 2019, the band released the self-titled album, Whiskey Myers. It debuted at No. 1 on Billboard Country, No. 2 on Billboard active rock, and No. 6 on the Billboard 200.

Band members

Current members 

 Cody Cannon – lead vocals, acoustic guitar, harmonica (2007–present)
 John Jeffers – lead guitar, slide guitar, lap steel, vocals (2007–present)
 Cody Tate – lead guitar, rhythm guitar, vocals (2007–present)
 Jeff Hogg – drums (2007–present)
 Tony Kent – percussion, keyboards (2016–present)
 Jamey Gleaves – bass guitar (2017–present)

Former members
 Gary Brown – bass guitar (2007–2017)

Timeline

Discography

Studio albums

Singles

Music videos

References

American country rock groups
Country music groups from Texas
Musical groups established in 2008